is a Japanese film director who has worked mainly in the comedy and horror genres. He has "made a name for himself by mixing goofy gore with manga-esque escapades and plain utter weirdness".

Life and career
After graduation he won a number of awards at independent film festivals. In 2000 he co-wrote (with director Ryuhei Kitamura) the action-horror film Versus (VERSUS　ヴァーサス) starring Tak Sakaguchi. Yamaguchi was also a second-unit director on the movie.

He made his debut as a feature film director with Battlefield Baseball released theatrically in July 2003. This horror-sports-comedy again starred Tak Sakaguchi and the film won the Grand Prize at the 14th Yubari International Fantastic Film Festival held in February 2003. Yamaguchi was a guest at the festival. He followed this in 2004 with Babaa Zone, a compilation of five short skits in collaboration with manga artist Gatarō Man. In late 2004, Yamaguchi was one of the directors of Takashi Shimizu's comedy-horror TV series .

As with Battlefield Baseball, his next feature, Cromartie High - The Movie from July 2005, was based on a manga series (Cromartie High School). This episodic comedy, which made its New York premiere at the 2006 New York Asian Film Festival, revolves around the hapless Cromartie High with a student body composed of thugs, yakuza look-alikes, a giant, a gorilla and an obnoxious robot. Kamiyama, seemingly the only normal student, tries to improve things - but then the aliens invade.

Yamaguchi's September 2006 film Meatball Machine, which he co-directed with Jun'ichi Yamamoto based on an earlier film by Yamamoto, has aliens taking over human bodies and turning them into bio-mechanical monsters. In August 2008, Yamaguchi released Tamami: The Baby's Curse, a horror story about a monster-baby which is a more subdued work than his previous manic comedy efforts. Along with Noboru Iguchi, Yamaguchi directed the fake TV commercials for good friend Yoshihiro Nishimura's cult horror film Tokyo Gore Police after Yamaguchi suggested that it might balance out the dark tone of the movie.

In a change of pace, Yamaguchi left the horror aspects behind to direct a straight comedy in the February 2009 release Elite Yankee Saburo with special makeup effects by Yoshihiro Nishimura. The film followed a Japanese TV comedy shown on TV Tokyo in 2007 which was itself based on a manga by Shuji Abe about a nerdy boy entering high school who because his older brothers were delinquents is also labeled a troublemaker - an "elite yankee". The movie retained the original cast from the TV series including lead actor Hideo Ishiguro.

Filmography

References

Bibliography

External links
 

Japanese film directors
Japanese screenwriters
1971 births
Living people
Horror film directors